Hooked on Phonics is a commercial brand of educational materials, originally designed for reading education through phonetics. First marketed in 1987, it used systematic phonics and scaffolded stories to teach letter–sound correlations (phonics) as part of children's literacy. The program has since expanded to encompass a wide variety of media, including books, computer games, music, videos, and flash cards in addition to books in its materials, as well as to include other subject areas. The target audience for this brand is primarily individuals and home school parents. The product was advertised extensively on television and radio throughout the 1990s.

History

Hooked on Phonics was developed in the 1980s. The original Hooked on Phonics Learn to Read product was released by Gateway Educational Products in 1987.

The company built a successful business based upon significant advertising, leading to sales of over $100M per year. The product, along with its catchphrase "Hooked on Phonics worked for me!" (spoken by children in the product's television ads) and its telephone number "1-800-ABCDEFG" (now belonging to the Wilshire Law Firm, PC), became widely recognized during the mid-1990s.  Among the major advertising venues of the period was the Rush Limbaugh radio program - also evolving at the time.

In 1994 the company was featured on the program Dateline NBC with an official from the FTC attacking the company for "deceptive advertising".  The FTC and Gateway reached a settlement later, with Gateway agreeing to advertising ground rules and disclosure of all research data and consumer complaints. Nevertheless, the negative media coverage caused the company's sales to plummet and the company to file for bankruptcy protection.

The year 2001 saw the introduction of test-taking strategies and study skills as part of the "Hooked on School Success" program and a new partnership with KinderCare Learning Centers to use materials in KinderCare's private child care facilities. 

In 2004 the FTC fined the company, then called Gateway Learning Corporation, for retroactively changing their privacy policy without informing customers, and subsequently sharing private information about customers including children with outside marketing firms.

In 2005 the product line was acquired by Educate, Inc., who also operated Sylvan Learning, and began selling products in retail. In 2006 the company released a new line of educational programs including Hooked on Spanish, Hooked on Handwriting, and Hooked on Spelling, among many others. 

By 2007, the Hooked on Phonics program had been introduced in over 30 countries. 

Hooked on Phonics was taken private in 2007 and the company renamed to Smarterville, Inc.

The flagship Learn to Read product underwent a major redesign, featuring DVDs, web customizations, and an entire new line of systematic phonics readers.  It was launched in the summer of 2009. Sixty music videos were added, composed by Russell Ginns and featuring performances by Cathy Fink, Marcy Marxer and the a cappella group The Bobs.

Hooked on Phonics was acquired by Sandviks Inc., in 2011.

Their Hooked on Phonics mobile app for iOS and Android was launched in 2013. As of 2018, it has been download more than 500,000 times.

In 2020 the Hooked on Phonics app was refreshed and relaunched.

In 2022, the Hooked on Math app was launched, and the umbrella brand Hooked & Company was introduced.

Authors

The full program features books and stories penned by more than fifty authors. These include:
Charlotte Zolotow
Robert D. San Souci
Russell Ginns
David Ezra Stein
Amy Kraft
Michael Artin
Jonathan Maier
Erica Pearl
Rosemary Wells
Jahnna N. Malcolm

Performers

The full program features songs by the following musicians:
The Bobs
Cathy Fink & Marcy Marxer
Marcy Heisler
Russell Ginns
Bob Dorough
Stuart Kollmorgan
Ben Steinfeld
Carolee Goodgold
Eric Stuart
April and Eva Ginns
Randy Thomas

Awards

Hooked on Phonics' products have won several awards over the years. These include:
 National Parenting Seal of Approval in 1998, 2005 and 2007
 Teachers' Choice Award in 2004, 2008 and 2009

See also
 List of phonics programs

References

External links
Hooked on Phonics website

Phonics curricula
Products introduced in 1987
Learning to read
Phonetics
Companies based in Danbury, Connecticut